James J. Lenihan Dam is an earthen structure across the Los Gatos Creek  creating the Lexington Reservoir in the Santa Cruz Mountains of Santa Clara County, California south of Los Gatos. The name was changed from Lexington Dam in 1996 for the retirement of James J. Lenihan, the Santa Clara Valley Water District's longest-serving director.

See also
 List of dams and reservoirs in California

References

External links
 
 https://web.archive.org/web/20100423163953/http://www.valleywater.org/Services/LexingtonReservoirAndLenihanDam.aspx
 http://www.metroactive.com/papers/metro/09.25.97/cover/naming1-9739.html

Buildings and structures in Santa Clara County, California
Dams in California
United States local public utility dams
Dams completed in 1956